Reliance Fresh is the convenience store format which forms part of the retail business of Reliance Industries of India under its subsidiary Reliance Retail.

See also 
List of Indian companies

References

External links 
 Reliance Official Site

Retail companies of India
Reliance Industries subsidiaries
Companies based in Mumbai
Retail companies established in 2006
Supermarkets of India
Reliance Retail
Indian companies established in 2006
2006 establishments in Maharashtra